Gatikha is a rural locality (a selo) in Penkinskoye Rural Settlement, Kameshkovsky District, Vladimir Oblast, Russia. The population was 693 as of 2010. There are 5 streets.

Geography 
Gatikha is located 22 km southwest of Kameshkovo (the district's administrative centre) by road. Leontyevo is the nearest rural locality.

References 

Rural localities in Kameshkovsky District
Vladimirsky Uyezd